Elections to Nuneaton and Bedworth Borough Council were held on 2 May 2002. The whole council was up for election following boundary changes, and the Labour Party retained control of the council.

After the election, the composition of the council was

 Labour 26
 Conservative 8

Election result

The breakdown of councillor terms as a result of the election is shown below. The seats of the councillors with two year terms were contested in the 2004 council election.

Ward results

2002
2002 English local elections
2000s in Warwickshire